Aspi Razil (also Romanized as Āspī Razīl) is a village in Sepiddasht Rural District, Papi District, Khorramabad County, Lorestan Province, Iran. At the 2006 census, its population was 90, in 15 families.

References 

Towns and villages in Khorramabad County